
Gmina Kunów is an urban-rural gmina (administrative district) in Ostrowiec County, Świętokrzyskie Voivodeship, in south-central Poland.

Villages
Apart from the town of Kunów, Gmina Kunów contains the villages and settlements of Biechów, Boksycka, Bukowie, Chocimów, Doły Biskupie, Doły Opacie, Janik, Kaplica, Kolonia Inwalidzka, Kolonia Piaski, Kurzacze, Małe Jodło, Miłkowska Karczma, Nietulisko Duże, Nietulisko Małe, Prawęcin, Rudka, Udziców and Wymysłów.

Neighbouring gminas
Gmina Kunów is bordered by the town of Ostrowiec Świętokrzyski and by the gminas of Bodzechów, Brody, Pawłów, Sienno and Waśniów.

References
Polish official population figures 2006

Kunow
Ostrowiec County